The 15027 / 15028 Maurya Express is an Express train belonging to North Eastern Railway zone that runs between  and  in India. It is currently being operated with 15027/15028 train numbers on a daily basis.

Due to the closure of Dhanbad–Chandrapura line, this train was diverted route to Dhanbad–Netaji Subhas Chandra Bose Gomoh–Chandrapura line. Now it has been restored on its previous route.

Service

The 15027/Maurya Express has an average speed of 36 km/hr and covers 851 km in 23h 30m. The 15028/Maurya Express has an average speed of 35 km/hr and covers 851 km in 24h 05m.

Route & Halts 

The important halts of the train are:

 
 
 
 
 
  (not now)

Coach composition

The train has mordern LHB rakes with max speed of 110 kmph. The train consists of 21 coaches:

 1 AC First cum II Tier (HA1)
 1 AC II Tier (A1)
 7 AC III Tier (B1 - B7)
 7 Sleeper coaches (S1 - S7)
 3 General Unreserved (GS)
 1 Divyangjan cun Guard Coach 
 1 Generator Car

Traction

Both trains are hauled by a  Pt. Deen Dayal Upadhyaya Nagar or Samastipur based WAP-4 electric locomotive from Hatia to Gorakhpur and vice versa.

Sometimes, both trains are hauled by a Gomoh based WAP-7 electric locomotive from Hatia to Gorakhpur and vice versa.

Direction reversal

Train used to reverse its direction 1 time at;

 

But the  line has once again resumed. The train does not touch NSC Bose Gomoh any more.

Coach composition 
It runs with 7 Sleeper coaches, 3 Second sitting coaches, 7 III AC Coaches, 1 II AC Tier Coach and 1 AC First cum II Tier AC Coach along with 1 Divyangjan Cum Guard Coach & 1 Generator Car.

See also 

 Hatia railway station
 Gorakhpur Junction railway station

References

External links 

 15027/Maurya Express
 15028/Maurya Express

Transport in Ranchi
Passenger trains originating from Gorakhpur
Named passenger trains of India
Rail transport in Jharkhand
Rail transport in Bihar
Rail transport in Uttar Pradesh
Express trains in India